St Columba's Catholic College, formerly the St Columba's High School, is an independent Roman Catholic co-educational secondary day school, located in the Blue Mountains region, on the border of Winmalee and Springwood, in New South Wales, Australia.

Established in 1979, the school is set in the grounds of the St Columba's property, which has extensive bushland surrounding the school. The property is a listed site on the Blue Mountains City Council local government heritage register.

Campus
Originally built as a Seminary in 1909, it was closed in 1977 and reopened as a high school in 1979. The monastic influence is seen in the neogothic sandstone architecture and the grounds with scattered grottos and shrines overlooking the Blue Mountains World Heritage National Park.

The St Columbas property is one of the largest landholdings in the Blue Mountains Local Government Area. Much of the property consists of natural bushland and is habitat for some threatened and endangered species.

Symbolism
 'Columba' is a Latinization of 'colum', which means dove. A dove is featured in the school emblem.
 'Iona Chapel' derives its name from the Island of Iona where Columba founded the monastery Iona Abbey.
  Much of the architecture features the Celtic Cross.
  The Feast Day of Columba on June 9th is celebrated annually by the college, notable events include the Teachers vs Year 12 basket/volleyball game.

Telescope
A feature of note is a radio telescope dish salvaged from the Paul Wild Observatory at Culgoora, west of Narrabri in 1997. This is one of a heliograph array of 96 13.7-m dishes that circled the present location of the Compact Array. The heliograph array imaged the Sun at 80 and 160 MHz with several discoveries to its credit before decommission.

Principals
The following individuals have served as Principal:

Notable alumni
Tom Eisenhuth rugby league player
Jenna Jones Paralympian
Emma Koster netball player
Claire Zorn writer

See also 

 List of Catholic schools in New South Wales
 Catholic Education, Diocese of Parramatta
 Catholic education in Australia

References

External links
 St. Columba's Catholic College Website
 St. Columba's High School Profile

Springwood
Roman Catholic Diocese of Parramatta
Educational institutions established in 1979
Gothic Revival architecture in Sydney
1979 establishments in Australia